= Left for Linguistic Tolerance =

Left for Linguistic Tolerance (in Spanish: Izquierda por la Tolerancia Lingüística), a political party in Catalonia, Spain, founded in 1993.
